Fennec is a French animated series, about a Fennec fox of the same name who solves little mysteries in the peaceful town of Chewington. The series was based on the book collection "Pickpocket" written by Alexis Lecaye and published by Gallimard.

The series aired in France on France 3, IDF1 and Playhouse Disney, in Belgium on Ketnet and K-T.V., in the Netherlands on Yorkiddin and K-T.V., in Spain on Fox Kids, in Brazil on SBT and in Scandinavia on K-T.V.

Episodes

References

External links

Official Site

1990s French animated television series
1997 French television series debuts
French children's animated mystery television series
French television shows based on children's books
Treehouse TV original programming
Animated television series about foxes